St Mary's was a Church of England parish church in Whittall Street, Birmingham, England.

History

St. Mary's Church was built in 1774, under an Act of 1772, on Catharine Street (later renamed Whittall Street), then on the northern edge of the town of Birmingham, as a chapel of ease to St Martin in the Bull Ring. The building was designed by Joseph Pickford. It was named to mark the donation of the land on which it stood, and £1,000 of its £4,500 building costs, by Mary Weaman.

Two years after opening, part of a gallery collapsed during a service, but the incident did not result in any injuries. Cast iron columns were added, to support the rebuilt galleries.

William Hutton, in the second edition of his An History of Birmingham (1783) wrote:

In 1786 John Wesley attended a service and heard a sermon by the first incumbent Edward Burn.

A parish was assigned to St. Mary's in 1841 out of St Martin in the Bull Ring.

In 1859, 15 women (of a total of 19), who had died in an explosion at Messrs Pursall and Philips Percussion Cap Manufactory, also in Whittall Street, were interred in a single vault in the church.

Structural problems were discovered in 1866 and the tower and spire were subsequently rebuilt in a Gothic style. A further rebuilding took place some time later.

In 1925 the church was closed pending demolition, for the expansion of Birmingham General Hospital. The parish was united with that of Bishop Ryder Church. The proceeds of the sale of the land went to build St Mary's Church, at Pype Hayes.

Its registers of baptisms (1774–1812) and burials (1779–1812) are at St. Martin's. Its silver communion service is at St. Mary's, except for two flagons which are in the collection of Birmingham Assay Office. A tablet commemorating William Thompson,  formerly in the church, and now in St Martin in the Bull Ring, reads:

The site is now occupied by Waterfall House. A thoroughfare at the north-west side of the site is still called St Mary's Row.

Vicars
John Riland ???? - 1810
Edward Burn 1810 - 1837
John Casebow Barrett 1837 - 1880
John Stanley Owen 1881 - 1886
J. Foster Pegg 1886 - 1892
Herbert Aylwin 1900 - 1905 (formerly vicar of Christ Church, Silloth)
H.M. Foyl 1905 - 1910
W.F.W. Hunter 1910 - 1925

References

Church of England church buildings in Birmingham, West Midlands
Churches completed in 1774
Mary
Buildings and structures demolished in 1925